James Barry Knowles (born 25 April 1959) is an English former footballer who played as a full-back. He most notably played for Wigan Athletic between 1984 and 1988, and was part of the team that won the Football League Trophy in 1985.

Knowles started his career at Southport, making 15 league appearances for the club. He then moved on to Runcorn, winning the Northern Premier League with the club. He signed for Wigan from Barrow in October 1984. He was part of the team that won the Freight Rover Trophy in 1985.

After retiring, he worked as a youth coach at Blackpool.

On 17 February 2015 he was appointed as head of youth development of Bharat FC in the I-League. In July 2016, he joined DSK Shivajians.

References

External links
 

1959 births
Living people
Footballers from Wigan
English footballers
Association football defenders
Southport F.C. players
Runcorn F.C. Halton players
Barrow A.F.C. players
Wigan Athletic F.C. players
Altrincham F.C. players
English Football League players